The 2006 Islamic Courts Union offensive is the period in the Somali Civil War that began in May 2006 with the Islamic Courts Union's (ICU) conquest of Mogadishu from the Alliance for the Restoration of Peace and Counter-Terrorism (ARPCT) and continued with further ICU expansion in the country. Following the outbreak of the war on December 21, 2006; by December 24, direct Ethiopian intervention in the conflict in support of the Transitional Federal Government (TFG) was no longer denied by the Ethiopian government. The Eritrean government denied any involvement despite Ethiopian claims to the contrary.

Origins
The rise of the Islamic Courts in Somalia began in the mid-1990s with the alliance of a group of Muslim legal scholars and business people led by Hassan Aweys (former leader of the AIAI) and Sharif Ahmed, with two other powerful elements: Yusuf Mohammed Siad Inda'ade the self-declared governor of Shabeellaha Hoose, and the militant Islamist group al-Itihaad al-Islamiya led by Hassan Abdullah Hersi al-Turki, forming the Islamic Courts Union.

Initially these three distinct elements maintained separate leadership, In July 2006, the Union of Islamic Courts and the AIAI merged to form the Supreme Islamic Courts Council (SICC). By the end of September Indha'adde's voluntary annexed his warlordship to the SICC, which created a larger unified organization.

Against them are posed the Transitional Federal Government, and the breakaway region of Puntland, plus other individual warlords and tribes.

How Ethiopian troops would become involved in the Somali conflict from July 20, 2006. Ethiopia maintained it was providing military assistance to the transitional government. Ethiopians feared that the Somali conflict would spill over into their territory, as Ethiopia's border is extremely porous and there are a variety of rebel groups that could cooperate with the Union of Islamic Courts.

United States involvement

The US interests in Somalia date back to funding and military backing of the government of Siad Barre in the 1970s. After the UN interventions of the 1990s, the US has mainly avoided involvement in the nation.

Officially, the present United States' interest in the Horn of Africa region comprises desires for stability and peace in Somalia, including support of the establishment of a new government under the Transitional Federal Government, passage of the UN Security Council resolution to deploy an African-led peacekeeping force known as IGASOM, delivery of humanitarian aid, as well as warnings against the spread of extremist and terrorist groups in the region, including Al-Qaeda.

As part of Operation Enduring Freedom, the Combined Joint Task Force - Horn of Africa was established in Djibouti. It serves to monitor and check the spread of terrorism, as well as deal with piracy. It has also undertaken humanitarian missions in the region, but it has no mandate towards the conflict in Somalia. The US denies any direct military operations in Somalia, or in neighboring Kenya, and stated that it has no intention of deploying troops to Somalia.

Regarding the conflict in Somalia there are allegations, both by the ICU as well as in western circles, of U.S. support of Ethiopian intervention. Evidence of favoritism in the conflict cited by Jonathan S. Landay and Shashank Bengali of the McClatchy Newspapers include:

U.S. sponsorship of a Dec. 6 U.N. Security Council resolution that authorized, over the Islamists' opposition, the deployment of an African peacekeeping force but omitted a demand for the withdrawal of the estimated 8,000 Ethiopian troops.
A visit by Army Gen. John Abizaid, head of U.S. Central Command, to Addis Ababa, Ethiopia, last month for talks with Prime Minister Meles Zenawi.
The Bush administration's failure to insist publicly on an Ethiopian withdrawal or to participate directly in efforts to negotiate a cease-fire and power-sharing agreement between the transitional government and the Islamic Courts.

The McClatchy article went on to cite U.S. politicians have played a part in American policy surrounding the conflict. Former majority leader in the Republican Party-run House of Representatives, Dick Armey, has been lobbying for Ethiopia and working to block a vote on a bipartisan bill (HR 5680) entitled "Ethiopia Freedom, Democracy and Human Rights Advancement Act of 2006" to cut U.S. security aid to Ethiopia if it failed to halt political repression. The Bush administration also opposed the bill.

The United States opposition to the formation of an Islamic Somalia led to the CIA making secret payments to aid Somali warlords in early 2006 organized under the name Alliance for the Restoration of Peace and Counter-Terrorism (ARPCT). Between May and June 2006, the Second Battle of Mogadishu occurred between the ARPCT and the ICU. The result was the driving of the ARPCT forces from Mogadishu, and the militant rise of the ICU.

Timeline

Second Battle of Mogadishu (May – June 2006) 

On June 4, 2006, the Courts and an alliance of Mogadishu warlords (formally gathering under the title Alliance for the Restoration of Peace and Counter-Terrorism in February 2006) had fought sporadically for years in minor turf battles over Mogadishu districts.  By March 2006 this had escalated to a decisive street war.  This led to major hostilities escalating in May dubbed the Second Battle of Mogadishu.

The Baidoa government's prime minister, Ali Mohammed Ghedi, demanded that the warlords cease fighting the ICU, but this command was universally ignored and so Gedi dismissed them from Parliament.

The battles for each of Mogadishu's districts were bloody and vicious and caused significant collateral damage, with hundreds killed or wounded in the crossfire.  As the months crawled by however, the Islamic Courts began to gain the upper hand.

By June 4 the ICU had taken Balcad and seized the primary ARPCT base in Mogadishu. The ICU was poised on the brink of victory.

By June 6 the warlords who had banded together to resist the Courts either retreated to Ethiopia or surrendered to the Islamic Courts, making the ICU the new masters of Mogadishu and its important port.

The Islamic Courts had imposed strict law and order over the parts of Mogadishu they controlled during the battles, and with their final victory law and order was declared to have returned to Mogadishu for the first time in 15 years.  This accomplishment was applauded both internationally and domestically as a significant achievement, but worries and fears of the ICU's intentions began to appear both domestically and internationally.

Consolidation of the Islamic Courts Union, Ethiopian intervention

On June 14, 2006, the Islamic Courts, having consolidated Mogadishu entirely with the surrender of the last warlord of the city, moved out from Mogadishu northward in a rapid consolidation campaign to link up with allied courts in other cities, and to push out the remaining regional warlords who had opposed them in Mogadishu or supported the ARPCT.

Jowhar was the most important warlord stronghold outside of Mogadishu, ruled by Mohammed Dheere. After securing allies in the town, the ICU advanced on Jowhar in early June, forcing Mohammed Dheere to flee north to Ethiopia on June 14 and capturing the town.

The Ethiopian government made the decision to support these exiled warlords in order to oppose what in their view is a critical threat posed by the Islamic Courts to their administration of the Ogaden region. This was inevitable considering the political stripe of the ICU, but was spurred primarily by the ICU's expansion and troop deployment up to the Ethiopian Border.  By mid June, Ethiopian troops were sent to the border, and Ethiopia began pressuring the Transitional Government to allow them to deploy troops in Baidoa.  Ethiopia began vocally referring to the ICU as "al Qaeda allies" and "Terrorists".

On June 22, 2006, the ICU and TFG met together in Khartoum, Sudan to work towards a peace agreement, in which the ICU recognized the "legality" of the TFG and the TFG recognized the "reality" of the ICU.

On July 1, 2006, a Web-posted message purportedly written by Osama bin Laden urged Somalis to build an Islamic state in the country and warned western states that his al Qaeda network would fight against them if they intervened there.

In mid July, Ethiopian forces massed in the town of Baidoa, warning the ICU not to move on the city.  Ethiopian forces under the command of Captain Hassey Aliow had crossed the Somali border into Hiraan numerous times in 2004 and 2005, and had several local allies amongst the Baadi’ade and Ujejeen clans.

The ICU moved into the Mudug region in the beginning of August, capturing Adado on 1 August following negotiations with the local clan Sultan.

This draws the ICU into the sphere of influence of Puntland, as Adado borders the important southern city of Galcayo.  Conflict ensues almost immediately after an Islamic Court is founded in south Galkayo (Puntland disputes ownership of South Galcayo with the local Sacad clan) and escalates rapidly up to the 9th of August.

The Sacad clan was largely divided between those Sacad who supported the ICU (the Sacad have their own Islamic Court in the capital) and those who oppose the ICU (led by Mohamed Warsame Ali "Kiimiko" and Abdi Qeybdiid).  The Anti-ICU Sacad unite and prepare to form their own state in South Galcayo, in order to resist both Puntland and the ICU.

Local Sacad Clan elders of South Galkayo and the regions of Mudug and Galgadud chose to form their own regional state, bringing in the territory of Abdi Qeybdid into Galmudug (Galgadud and Mudug) on the 14th of August in order to avoid annexation into Puntland or the ICU.

The alliance with Mohammed Dheere, along with the clan-based support from the Galjeel to topple the Hawadle brought the ICU into Hiraan, conquering both Beletweyne and Buulo Barde by August 13.

In order to make good on their promise to restore law and order to Somalia, the ICU began invading the territory of coastal warlords known to be engaged in piracy. The most infamous pirates in Somalia operated out of Harardhere and Hobyo, and so these towns were targeted for the anti-piracy campaign.  The most infamous pirates were from the same clan as the ICU leadership, the Habar Gidir.
Harardere, the most infamous piracy port, was captured on 13 August.

Hobyo negotiated a surrender with the ICU on August 16 where Hobyo would join Galmudug. Fighting quiets down in the north as Galmudug forms a buffer state between the ICU and Puntland, ending the violence between those two.

The Transitional Government in Baidoa steps up their pressure for African Union peacekeepers to be deployed in the country to prevent the ICU from capturing any more territory, and the primary anti-ICU nations (Ethiopia, Kenya, Uganda) pull together troops and funds to deploy a force in Kismayo.

Barre Hiraale had been careful to avoid a confrontation with the ICU due to the fact that his chief opponent in the Juba Valley Alliance leadership, Mohamed Roble Jim’ale Gobale was pro-ICU.  Mohamed Roble had taken part in their battle to control Mogadishu, and had the support of the ICU leadership.  Barre Hiraale was pro-Government and held the position of Defence Minister in the Transitional Federal Parliament.  Hiraale's fear was an ICU invasion in support of Mohamed Roble, which would lead to division within his own ranks due to partisan Sub-Clan loyalties within the JVA.

Barre Hiraale spoke out against the proposed deployment of peacekeepers, and publicly stated he would not allow peacekeepers into the country through Kismayo, the proposed point of entry and resupply.  While Somalis had bad experiences generally with peacekeeping missions, the ICU considered a peacekeeping force to be casus belli to attack the government, of which Barre Hiraale was a member.  Soon after the peacekeeping mission was approved, the ICU began moving their forces south towards Jubaland.  Barre Hiraale's attempt to find a "third way", seemed to have failed.

Invasion of Jubaland, taking of Kismayo 

On September 24, 2006, in order to prevent the deployment of thousands of AU troops in the country, the Courts invaded Jubaland and seized Kismayo, after Barre Hirale's Juba Valley Alliance withdrew from the town in the face of overwhelming opposition and the mutiny of several JVA factions to the ICU.

Relations with the Transitional Government collapsed. Ethiopia deployed hundreds of troops in Baidoa, and those numbers would continue to increase into thousands. The capture of Kismayo soured relations with both Somaliland and Puntland, as Jubaland was recognized as a political entity in many Somali circles, as opposed to the warlords who were universally viewed as being illegitimate.

The Juba Valley Alliance vowed to retake Kismayo, and regrouped their forces in Bu'ale.
Later, on September 29, the ICU declared their intention to unify and centralize their military forces under a single command.

On September 30, 2006, minor skirmishes in the north with Ethiopian troops near the border aggravate the situation further.

An attempt was made by the ICU and JVA forces to agree to a ceasefire, but Ethiopian reinforcements emboldened JVA forces sufficiently to continue the fighting.  Despite this, the JVA loses Afmadow to the ICU on October 5.

Anti-ICU protests in Kismayo led to several deaths and a curfew being imposed on the city.  These protests were sparked by the decision by local ICU authorities to ban Khat use in Kismayo.

In October 10 the local Islamic Sharia court react to an Ethiopian cross-border expedition as a precursor to the Ethiopian invasion the ICU had been fearing for months, and calls for emergency reinforcements from Mogadishu and Jihad against Ethiopia are made.

Ethiopian forces had been massed over the other side of the border from Beledweyne since mid July, and the tension was palpable.  Within weeks, thousands of soldiers would be staring over the border at each other and fingering their triggers.

The ICU captures Bu'alle and Badhadhe from the JVA on October 15, pushing the JVA out of Lower Juba entirely. Barre Hirale attempted a final push to recapture Kismayo and Bu'alle through mid October, mustering all of his forces for a final battle near Kismayo where his forces were defeated, along with a simultaneous attempt to capture Bu'alle.  Several of the Marehan subclans had opened their own negotiations with the ICU, and his position was weakening by the day.
The JVA regrouped their remaining forces in Sakow, though the alliance itself was unravelling.

Jihad declared against Ethiopia 

In October 26 the ICU is victorious in Sakow, capturing the town and pushing the JVA out of Middle Juba as well.  The remains of JVA forces pull back to Bardhere in Gedo.

Transitional Government and Ethiopian troops seize Burhakaba briefly from ICU-allied militias, directly violating the Khartoum agreements.  The ICU leadership consider the brief capture of Burhakaba as a violation of the peace agreement signed in Khartoum, and further talks, scheduled for the end of the month, seem less and less likely.
The fact that the government soldiers were supported by Ethiopian soldiers prompted the ICU leadership to declare a jihad against all Ethiopian soldiers in Somalia. The Beledweyne Sharia court had already issued a call for jihad earlier, but this made it official.

A televised address by Sharif Sheikh Ahmed, chairman of the Supreme Council and the most moderate and respected of the ICU leadership, wearing a military style outfit and holding an AK-47, broke the news of Jihad to Somalia.  In a much more low profile move Hassan Aweys, the Shura Council chairman, took it a step further and called for all Ethiopians, Muslim or otherwise, to rise up and overthrow the "oppressive regime of Meles Zenawi".

Advances into Galmudug, further conflict with Puntland 

On November 1, 2006, the ICU forces assume control over Hobyo, which is the capital of South Mudug State, part of Galmudug.
Religious leaders in the northern half of Galkacyo (the half controlled by Puntland) set up an Islamic Court, which the government of Puntland vows to dismantle or destroy, creating a tense situation as ICU forces head towards Galmudug-controlled South Galkacyo to protect the new Islamic Court.  Abdi Qebdiid, former member of the ARPCT and now an important figure in Galmudug, vows to defeat them.

Barre Hiraale returns to Baidoa, as several branches of his Marehan clan set up Islamic courts in Bardhere and Afmadow and declare their support for the Islamic Courts.  As Islamist support north of Bardhere is very strong, and Bardhere was previously the last bastion of anti-ICU sentiment in Gedo, the Gedo region is poised to fall into the hands of the Islamic Courts.

Baidoa's military buildup continues to be plagued by division, as 30 more government soldiers along with their technicals defected to the Islamic Courts.

The ICU enacts into law the Prohibition of Khat in all territories they control on November 17, 2006, due to the concerns of many ICU leaders as to the social effects of Khat use, and in response to violent protests by Khat vendors in Mogadishu that lead to the death of a 13-year-old boy.  This decision may prove to be counterproductive to the ICU's agenda of restoring law and order, as prohibition laws historically trend towards increased rather than decreased criminality.

Puntland's president, Adde Musa, signed a deal with the Islamic Court of Galkayo in order to stem the tide of violence that the town had experienced for over a week. The details of this deal include the establishment of Sharia as the legal code, and holding a "grand conference" in Garowe to discuss the future of Puntland. Puntland has much to gain from switching sides over to the Islamic Courts, as Puntland is in a longstanding dispute with Somaliland over the Sool and Sanaaq regions, and the Islamic Courts have a dispute with Somaliland over the imprisonment of an important religious leader.

On November 26, armed with over 30 "technicals", gunmen allied with the Islamic Courts have been reported to have taken full control over the town of Abudwaq, in western Galgadud region bordering Ethiopia.  Abudwaq was the power base of Abdi Qebdiid, limiting Galmudug to South Galcayo alone.

Ethiopian forces who were based in the administrative division of which Abudwaq is the seat, appeared to have pulled back across the border and massed their forces for a possible counterattack.  ICU forces along the Ethiopian border were also reported to be massing.  Were the Ethiopians to invade, it would most likely bring the conflict into Ethiopian territory.  Ethiopia's border is extremely porous and there are a variety of rebel groups who would love to cooperate with ICU forces.

The situation in Baidoa became increasingly tense as a suicide car bomb attack in the city killed at least 8 people, involving at least 2 cars filled with explosives.  The Transitional Government and Ethiopia immediately blamed the ICU for the attack, though no one assumed responsibility for the attack.  The attack took place at a road checkpoint, and the attacker was apparently a veiled woman.

Ogaden Online reported that the Ethiopian government itself masterminded the attack, citing an investigation by their reporters, who first reported on the plotting in November.

Matters escalated further as an Ethiopian convoy was ambushed by pro-ICU forces near Baidoa, the day after Ethiopian forces fired missiles at Bandiradley.

Another car bomb exploded in Bakin, on the approaches to Baidoa, on November 30. The minibus had served carrying people between Mogadishu and Baidoa.

Advance on Baidoa 

In December 2, 350 soldiers from the Digil and Mirifle clans defected from the ICU to the government. Dinsoor, a primarily Digil and Mirifle district under Southwestern Somali administration, defects to the ICU. The Digil and Mirifle are a major clan in Somalia, with large populations throughout Bay and Bakool regions, and the shift in support weakened the government position considerably.

The Digil and Mirifle clans make up the broader Rahanweyn group of clans, and the leader of the Rahanweyn Resistance Army, Aden Saran-Sor, has been accused of opposing the government since October 31. If Aden Saran-Sor has joined the ICU, then the RRA and the Rahanweyn clan as a whole will be divided between ICU supporters and government supporters, with the critical military support being on the ICU side. The government's base in Baidoa is hosted by Rahanweyn-controlled Southwestern Somalia, and if Southwestern Somalia falls to the ICU, Baidoa will be entirely encircled, and local resistance to the capture of Baidoa would be muted if the locals support the ICU.

On December 3, 60 ICU soldiers along with their technicals surrendered to government forces in Baidoa, dissatisfied by the ICU's extremist policies.

On December 6, the United Nations Security Council approved a deployment of IGAD peacekeepers exempt from the UN arms embargo to protect Baidoa, effectively taking sides in the conflict.  Ethiopia, Kenya and Djibouti were barred from taking part in the peacekeeping operation, leaving it up to Uganda, Tanzania and Eritrea.  The resolution is primarily aimed at encouraging Uganda to deploy troops to protect Baidoa, which is a highly controversial issue in Uganda due to the UN arms embargo and the threats of the ICU to fight any peacekeepers in Somalia.

On December 7, 2006, The Eritrean Permanent Mission to the UN officially denied its nation had any troops in Somalia.

On December 8, the ICU reported heavy fighting with government forces, backed by Ethiopian troops in the town of Dinsoor, in what many fear would spark an invasion of the heavily fortified city of Baidoa by the massed ICU forces stationed in Burhakaba. Residents in Baidoa began fleeing the city, in fear of the fighting spilling over into Baidoa.

The fighting carried over into the next day, with ferocious artillery duels reported across a front line roughly located at Rama'addey village.

To complicate the situation, Mohammed Dheere, the warlord of Jowhar who had been defeated almost 6 months previously and fled to Ethiopia, crossed the border into Hiraan with his rebuilt militia and more than 60 technicals. By the 11th, fighting near Dinsoor had settled down to a stable front line at Safarnooles village. 

Reports indicate that the ICU began advancing towards Tyeeglow on December 11, 2006, continuing the encirclement of Baidoa. From Tyeeglow the ICU has the ability to attack the northern supply routes to Baidoa with virtual impunity.  To entirely encircle Baidoa, the ICU needs to capture Hudur, Luuk and Wajid, and these towns are all along the road from Tyeeglow.

The ICU's strategy became clear following the battles near Dinsoor, which clearly demonstrated that the ICU has sufficient firepower to force their way into Baidoa if they chose to.  The ICU has chosen instead to cut off all support to the city and force it to surrender, while simultaneously taking control of the rest of Bay and Bakool.

On December 13, Somalia's prime minister announced Islamic Courts Union (ICU) forces were moving into positions for an attack on the last government stronghold of Baidoa in "what may now be an inevitable war". The settlement of Ufurow, 90 km from the interim government capital at Baidoa, capitulated to the ICU without fighting. ICU troops were said to be within 20 km of Baidoa near Buurhakaba. Government troops held a front line at Daynuunay, and ICU troops — identified by a local resident as being from the SICC (Somalia Islamic Courts Council) — were described as within 2 km of their positions and advancing.  Rumors suggested the ICU was also moving to capture the non-aligned area of Tiyoglow 90 km northeast of Boidoa.

A Reuters report cited the ICU claimed 30,000 Ethiopian troops were involved in Somalia, while 4,000 foreign fighters were involved on the side of the ICU. Ethiopia denied having troops other than "military advisors" present.

Meanwhile, Italian special envoy to Ethiopia, Mario Raffaelli, met with the ICU in Mogadishu to attempt peacemaking, but was met with skepticism. Somalia's parliament speaker Sharif Hassan Sheik Aden and ICU chairman Sheik Sharif Sheik Ahmed met in succession with Yemeni president Ali Abdalla Salah.  Arab League efforts for peace talks in Khartoum, Sudan, were postponed, angering the ICU.

In Garowe, Puntland on the same day, police opened fire on the security forces surrounding Puntland President Mohamud Adde Muse, protesting lack of payment. It was also reported soldiers robbed a bank because of government neglect.

On December 14, 2006, the ICU entered Salagle, one of the few towns in the Juba region outside of their control. Two soldiers loyal to the TFG Minister of Defense, Col. Barre Hirale, were ambushed and killed between Baardhere and Dinsoor.

On December 15, dozens of former fighters for the TFG arrived in Mogadishu riding six technicals, three trucks armed with antiaircraft guns and three pickups mounting machine guns. The fighters cited their desire to leave was due to Baidoa coming under Ethiopian control. They defected 40 days before (presumably about November 5) and finally reached the capital after moving slowly through the jungle. The ICU claimed over 600 troops have defected since February 2006. The defecting troops were disarmed and ordered to undergo new training. In Washington, Assistant Secretary of State, Jendayi Frazer said that the United States had no plans to commit troops to Somalia, and urged African nations to meet the commitments of the UN resolution for peacekeepers.

On December 16, the Parliament Speaker Sharif Hassan Sheik Aden for the Transitional Government in Somalia bypassed the government and signed an agreement with the Union of Islamic Courts toward a peace initiative, the Transitional Government said the agreement was invalid, however, as he had bypassed his authority.

On December 17, the Islamic Courts claimed 200 troops from the Manas camp in Al-Bayan region defected to their side. Salad Ali Jelle, deputy defense minister for the TFG, denied this claim and further asserted the TFG had 6,000 troops under its command ready to defend its territory. Also on the 17th, General Mohamed Muse Hersi, also known as "Adde Muse," President of the autonomous Somali province of Puntland, flew to Baidoa to meet with the TFG.

On December 19, the ICU declared that it was not going to attack after the lapse of the one-week timeframe for Ethiopian withdrawal. Both sides seem to have backed away from a military confrontation at this time. Fifty more government troops were said to have defected in Gedo province and were now with the ICU in Bur Dhubo. TFG Premier Ali Mohammed Gedi raised the claim of foreign fighters present in Somalia to 5000. ICU commander Sheikh Ahmed Hassan Abuu Rayan stated he was positioning an unspecified number more militia troops along the border with Ethiopia in Far Libah town, Hiran region. ICU forces were also said to be approaching Bardhere in Gedo province near the Kenyan border. Colonel Abdulahi Sheik Fara-Tag was named as the commander of the TFG forces defending the town from attack.

Fall of the Islamic Courts Union

On December 20, major fighting broke out around the TFG capital of Baidoa. Thirteen trucks filled with Ethiopian reinforcements were reported en route to the fighting. However, leaders of both groups are keeping an option open for peace talks brokered by the EU.

On December 22, nearly 20 Ethiopian tanks were seen heading toward the front line. According to government sources Ethiopia has 20 T-55 tanks and four attack helicopters in Baidoa. It is not known if these tanks are taking part in the battle.

On December 23, Ethiopian tanks and further reinforcements arrived in Daynuunay, 30 kilometres east of Baidoa; prompting ICU forces to vow all-out war despite a commitment to an EU-brokered peace. Heavy fighting continued in Iidale and Dinsoor.

On December 24, Ethiopia admits that its troops are fighting the 
Islamists, after stating earlier in the week that it had only sent several hundred
military advisors to Baidoa. Heavy fighting erupted in border areas, with
air strikes and shelling being reported. Eyewitness said Ethiopian troops
bombarded the ICU-held town of Beledweyne. According to Ethiopian Information Minister Berhan Hailu: "The Ethiopian government has taken self-defensive measures and started counter-attacking the aggressive extremist forces of the Islamic Courts and foreign terrorist groups."

On December 25, Ethiopian and Somali forces captured Beledweyne, with ICU forces fleeing Beledweyne at the same time Ethiopian fighter jets bombed two airports. Heavy fighting was also reported in Burhakaba.

On December 26, the ICU was in retreat on all fronts, losing much of the territory they gained in the months preceding the Ethiopian intervention. They reportedly fell back to Daynuunay and Mogadishu.

On December 27, Ethiopian and Somali government forces were reported
en route to Somalia's capital, Mogadishu after capturing the strategic town of Jowhar, 90 km from the capital. The UIC were in control of little more than the coast. Islamist leaders evacuated many towns without putting up a fight. Also, the UIC top two commanders, defense chief Yusuf Indade and his deputy Abu Mansur were away on the Hajj pilgrimage in Mecca.

After the Fall of Mogadishu to the Ethiopian and government forces on December 28, fighting continued in the Juba River valley, where the UIC retreated, establishing a new headquarters in the city of Kismayo. Intense fighting was reported on December 31 in the Battle of Jilib and the ICU frontlines collapsed during the night to artillery fire, causing the ICU to once again go into retreat, abandoning Kismayo, without a fight and retreating towards the Kenyan border.

References

Somali Civil War
2006 in Somalia
2006 in politics
Politics of Somalia
Islamic Courts Union